Peter Dedecker (born 7 November 1983 in Zottegem) is a former Belgian politician and is affiliated to the N-VA. He was elected as a member of the Belgian Chamber of Representatives in 2010.

Notes

1983 births
Living people
Members of the Chamber of Representatives (Belgium)
New Flemish Alliance politicians
People from Zottegem
21st-century Belgian politicians